"Alive" is a song by American hip hop group the Beastie Boys, released as the first single from their compilation album Beastie Boys Anthology: The Sounds of Science.

"Big Shot" is a live cover originally by Billy Joel.  "Start!" is a mainly instrumental cover originally by The Jam.

Track listing
CD 1
 "Alive" – 3:50
 "You + Me Together" – 3:13
 "Big Shot (Live)" – 3:04
 "Alive" (Video)

CD 2
 "Alive" – 3:50
 "Alive (B.R.A. Remix)" – 3:36
 "Start!" – 2:50
 "Start!" (Video)

Charts

Release history

References

1999 singles
Beastie Boys songs
Capitol Records singles
1999 songs
Songs written by Ad-Rock
Songs written by Mike D
Songs written by Adam Yauch